Fosnetupitant is a medication used for the treatment of chemotherapy-induced nausea and vomiting. It is a prodrug of netupitant. It is used in combination with palonosetron hydrochloride and formulated as the salt fosnetupitant chloride hydrochloride for intravenous use.

In 2018, the U.S. Food and Drug Administration approved the intravenous formulation of a fixed dose combination of fosnetupitant and palonosetron. The combination is also approved for medical use in the European Union and in Canada.

References

External links 
 

Prodrugs
Antiemetics
NK1 receptor antagonists
Trifluoromethyl compounds
Piperazines
Pyridines
Quaternary ammonium compounds
2-Tolyl compounds